Juan Jusdado (born 7 December 1966) is a former Spanish racing cyclist. He rode in the 1989 Tour de France.

References

External links

1966 births
Living people
Spanish male cyclists
Cyclists from Madrid